Out of the Blue is the debut of Claudia Carawan, and derives its sound from several styles including soul, old school R&B, reggae and jazz. The lyrics of the album lean heavily on messages of hope, love, and inspiration. The album was released to positive reviews; Andy Garrigue commented that "Both sultry and righteous, sassy and pouting, Carawan's got a hair raising set of pipes. She sets a mood impossible to ignore."

Track listing
 "The Journey" - 4:13
 "The People Who Love You" - 4:09
 "Love Came Home" - 4:56
 "Everything I Need" - 5:00
 "Guardian Angel" - 4:16
 "Leap of Faith" - 3:54
 "I Wish You Well" - 4:49
 "It's Gonna Come Back To You" - 3:31
 "Count Your Blessings (Instead of Sheep)" (Irving Berlin) - 4:25
 "Brighter Day" - 6:14
 "What a Wonderful World" (Bob Thiele / George David Weiss) - 2:42

References

External links
Lyrics for Out of the Blue

2003 albums